Document #7 is the second full-length album by American screamo band Pg. 99, originally released in early 2001 through Happy Couples Never Last. The vinyl edition first came out on July 23, 2002, through Magic Bullet Records. There were four pressings of the album on vinyl, with a total of 1,902 vinyl copies pressed. The album's overall tone and sound is very different to other Pg. 99 releases, focussing much more on progression and atmosphere rather than energetic fury. Originally, the entire record was supposed to be the Pg.99 side of a cancelled split with Love Lost But Not Forgotten and The Hareste.

The album would eventually go out-of-print for years, however Magic Bullet would release the album digitally on Bandcamp (as well as making it available on streaming services) on August 11, 2017, to coincide with the band's 2017 reunion tour. A planned cassette release of the album via guitarist Mike Taylor's label Yr Screaming Youth has been announced as well.

Track listing

Personnel

Pg.99
Blake Midgette - vocals
Chris Taylor - vocals
Mike Taylor - guitar, cover art
Mike Casto - guitar
George Crum - guitar
Cory Stevenson - bass
Brandon Evans - bass, vocals
Johnny Ward - drums

Production
Nikki Kelce - artwork
Fil - photography
Mike Bossier - recording, production

References

External links
 
 Document #7 on Bandcamp

2001 albums
Pg. 99 albums